George Cartwright was an Australian professional soccer player who played as a goalkeeper for the Australia national soccer team.

Club career

Leichhardt Rovers
Cartwright grew up in Balmain to play with the Leichhardt Rovers. He also won the State U18 Nurse Cup.

Balmain Gladstone
He had suffered a season injury early into the 1925 Sydney Metropolitan season by a hand cut from a boot by Batten. He was then sent to St. Vincent's Hospital where he had three stitches inserted.

Representative career
Cartwright began his international career with Australia in 1922 as the country's first capped goalkeeper in a 3–1 loss to New Zealand on 17 June 1922.

He was chosen to take part for one of the Newcastle representative teams on 12 May 1924. Around three weeks later, he was chosen for Australia's goalkeeper in their historic tour against Canada in 1924. At the end of the tour, Cartwright was awarded a souvenir medal for being adjudged the best Australian goalkeeper in the test matches against Canada.

Career statistics

International

References

Australian soccer players
Association football goalkeepers
Australia international soccer players